Rasul Jafarian (born June 30, 1964) is an Iranian clergyman and researcher in field of Iranian history. He is currently the Professor of the Department of History at the University of Tehran, the Director of The specialized library on Islam and Iran, and the Director of the Central Library of the University of Tehran. Rasul Jafarian became a permanent member of the Academy of Sciences of Iran in June 2018 with the vote of the members of the General Assembly of the Academy of Sciences.

Life

Birth
Rasul Jafarian was born on June 30, 1964, in Khvorasgan, Isfahan Province, Iran.

Education
After completing his primary education in Khvorasgan, he traveled to Isfahan and spent his Middle school education there. During his stay in Isfahan, Jafarian freely attended classes in religious schools. He migrated to Qom in 1978 to continue his seminary education and first attended the classes of Khan School and then Resalat School.

Teaching
In 1980, after completing his studies, began teaching at the University of Tehran and University of Isfahan. Islamic studies and history of Islam are among the fields that he has taught. Jafarian became a permanent member of Academy of Sciences of Iran in June 2018 and is currently teaching at the University of Tehran with the rank of professor.

Research field
Jafarian's main research is on the history of Shia Islam, but he has also done a lot of research in fields such as the political history of the beginning of Islam and the history of the Safavid period. He has also published numerous studies and articles on the history of Iranian pilgrimage (Hajj).

Awards

Jafarian has received several national awards for his writings. The book Atlas of Shia, selected for Iran's Book of the Year Awards and winner of the Jalal Al-e Ahmad Literary Awards and the Farabi International Award and the book The currents and religious-political organizations in Iran have also been selected for the Farabi International Award.

Executive responsibilities

Jafarian has also had several executive responsibilities in his record. These responsibilities include:

1. Establishment and management of The specialized library on Islam and Iran in 1995.

2. Head of Library, Museum and Documentation Center of the Islamic Consultative Assembly of Iran from September 2008 to November 17, 2012.

3. Head of the Central Library and Documentation Center of the University of Tehran since November 2017.

Bibliography

Jafarian is a prolific writer and has many works in the science of history. He started writing in 1985 with a book entitled An Introduction to the History of Islam. He has authored more than 90 books, some of which are in large numbers; For example, his book entitled Historical essays have been republished more than 20 volumes. What doubles the importance of his work is the impact of his pen; In a way, some of his works are among the academic curriculum resources and the resources of master and doctorate in history in Iran. His works have been translated into other languages such as English, Arabic and Urdu. Some of Jafarian's works are:

 Atlas of Shia
 The intellectual and political life of Shia Imams
 Political History of Islam
 Religio-political currents and organizations in Iran
 History of Islamic Iran
 Reflection on the Ashura movement

Law on the use of electronic resource files
In August 2020, Rasul Jafarian proposed a law on the use of electronic resource files in Iran. In a note, he proposed a bill to use electronic files of resources (books, articles and dissertations) to the Ministry of Culture and Islamic Guidance of Iran to send to the government and parliament to take a step towards publishing digital books.

See also
Mostafa Mohaghegh Damad
Abdolmohammad Ayati
Ahad Gudarziani
Ahmad Kazemi
Ali Osat Hashemi
Alireza Feyz
Fathollah Mojtabaei
Mahmoud Mar'ashi Najafi

References

External links
Rasul Jafarian – Google Scholar
Rasul Jafarian articles in English on SID
The Author Caught Between Khamenei And Ahmadinejad
Rasul Jafarian English articles on Magiran
Iranian doc reviews assassination of Imam Hassan (AS) based on study by Western scholars
Rasul Jafarian English articles list
The Effect of Tabriz Geographical Location on the City Economy in the Ilkhanid Era
Specialized library of Majlis history established

1964 births
Living people
Academic staff of the University of Tehran
Academy of Sciences of Iran members
Farabi International Award recipients
Iran's Book of the Year Awards recipients
Iranian historians of Islam
Iranian Shia clerics
Iranian Shia scholars of Islam
Iranian male writers
Heads of the National Library of Iran
21st-century Iranian historians